In Greek mythology, Myrina or perhaps more correctly Myrtea is a minor mythological figure, a young priestess connected to myrtle and Aphrodite, the godddess of beauty and love. Her story is attested in the works of two authors; Maurus Servius Honoratus, a Latin grammarian who lived during the early fifth century AD, and the anonymous second Vatican Mythographer, whose work survives in a single manuscript that was found in 1401.

Etymology 
Robert Beekes suggested a pre-Greek origin due to the myrt-/myrs- variation.

Mythology 
Myrina was an exceedingly beautiful maiden who was kidnapped by robbers and held in a cave while they committed their robberies, but she managed to escape and return to her home. Since she credited the gods for her safety and freedom, she decided to devote herself to Aphrodite, the goddess of love, and became her priestess. But her previous betrothed came to the temple and took her anyway, so she killed him. She was then changed into a myrtle shrub. Because she had been such a loyal priestess, Aphrodite granted pleasant aroma to the myrtle and made it her sacred plant, explaining the myrtle's connection to Aphrodite.

Servius, spelling her name as Myrene, adds that as a priestess, one day she recognised one of her captors among the crowd, and dragged him to the middle of the crowd. The man confessed and gave out the names of his associates. A young man, who had previously loved her, took up the task of hunting down the robbers. When he returned successful, he asked for a reward, and the people of the town allowed him to take Myrene to wife, in spite of her being a priestess. But Aphrodite was displeased to see her priestess break her vows, so she killed him and turned Myrene into myrtle.

The myrtle, which grows by the sea and was seen as appropriate for feminine necessities, was one of the most commons symbols and sacred plants connected to Aphrodite due to its link with her myths and stories, while 'Myrtia' (meaning "she of the myrtle") was one of Aphrodite's many cult titles, as was 'Murcia', meaning the same thing, for her Roman counterpart, the goddess Venus. In ancient Greece dreams about myrtle garlands were seen as auspicious for women due to the myrtle's connection to Aphrodite. The plant was also associated with Hymen, another love god sometimes said to be Aphrodite's son, and the Muse Erato. In the myth of Cupid and Psyche, Venus hits Psyche with a myrtle branch. Myrtle was also worn by her attendants, the Graces.

See also 

 Adonis
 Callisto
 Daphne
 Peristera
 Rhodopis and Euthynicus

Notes

References

Bibliography 
 
 
 
 
 
 
 
  Online version at Perseus.tufts project.
 Maurus Servius Honoratus, In Vergilii carmina comentarii. Servii Grammatici qui feruntur in Vergilii carmina commentarii; recensuerunt Georgius Thilo et Hermannus Hagen. Georgius Thilo. Leipzig. B. G. Teubner. 1881. Online version at the Perseus Digital Library.

External links 
 
 

Deeds of Aphrodite
Metamorphoses into flowers in Greek mythology
Women in Greek mythology
Greek mythological priestesses